The Kılıç Ali Pasha Mosque is a mosque at the heart of a complex designed and built between 1580 and 1587 by Mimar Sinan, who at the time was in his 90s. The mosque itself was constructed in 1578-1580.

The complex is located in the Tophane neighbourhood of the Beyoğlu district of Istanbul, Turkey. It was built for the Kapudan-i Derya (Grand Admiral) Kılıç Ali Pasha who was told to build it beside the sea because he was an admiral. . The complex consists of a mosque, a medrese, a hamam, a türbe, and a fountain.

The Kılıç Ali Pasha Mosque originally stood right beside the Bosphorus, but since the water in front of it has since been filled in, it is now surrounded by other buildings (in particular it now faces the Galataport cruise terminal).

Architecture

Mosque
Towards the entrance, on two sides, there is a two-storey gallery. The dome is placed at the center with two exedrae rather like a Byzantine basilica, thus the resemblance to Hagia Sophia.

Above the prayer hall are five small domes carried on six marble columns. The tile panels placed high up in the prayer hall are inscribed with ayats (verses) from the Quran. The mosque has only one minaret with one gallery but there are 247 windows including the twenty-four of the central dome. The mihrab is in a square projecting apse.

A 16th-century ship lamp that used to hang from the central dome was removed to the Museum of Ottoman and Turkish Naval History (now the Istanbul Naval Museum/Deniz Müzesi) in 1948.

Two chronograms in the mosque both date it to 988 in the Hijri (Islamic) calendar (1580 in the Julian calendar).

One of the two inscriptions, at the outer entrance of the complex, features a four-verse poem in jali thuluth calligraphic script in Ottoman Turkish by the poet Ulvî and written by calligrapher Demircikulu Yusuf:
Mîr-i bahr â’nî Kılıç Paşa Kapudan-ı zemân
Yaptı çün bu camii ola yeri Darüsselâm
Hâtif-i kudsî görüp Ulvî dedi tarihini
Ehl-i imâna ibâdetgâh olsun bu makam
The letters in the final line - 'May this be a house of worship for people of the faith' - add up to the number 988.

Courtyard 
The courtyard contains a marble fountain for ablutions before prayer with eight columns and a dome. The outer porch has a sloping roof supported by twelve columns on the west façade and three at each end, all with rhombus-shaped capitals. In the center a marble portal leads into the mosque.

The graveyard contains the octagonal türbe of Kılıç Ali Pasha with a dome designed by Mimar Sinan. Its wooden doors are inlaid with mother-of-pearl.

Medrese 

The medrese, opposite the southeast corner of the mosque, is almost square. It's possible that it was not designed by Mimar Sinan since it doesn't appear in the official list of his works, the Tazkirat-al-Abniya.

Hamam 

To the right of the mosque is the hamam, completed in 1583. The glass doors lead into two separate soğukluks (cool rooms) on either side of the hararet (caldarium - hot room) which is hexagonal in plan with open bathing places in four of its six arched recesses, the other two opening on to the soğukluks. The placement of the soğukluks and the plan of the hararet differ from the usual layout used by Sinan in other surviving hamams.

Gallery

Stories associated with the mosque
After an examination of the complex's foundation documents, the Turkish researcher Rasih Nuri İleri claimed  that the Spanish writer Miguel de Cervantes had been a slave during its construction, like the captive character in his novel Don Quixote.

When Kılıç Ali Pasha decided to endow a mosque toward the end of his life, he applied to the state for a grant of land (all land in the Ottoman Empire belonged to the state). He and the Grand Vizier Rüstem Pasha disliked each other intensely, so the Vizier is reported to have said: "Since he is the admiral, let him build his mosque on the sea." Undeterred, Kılıç Ali Pasha had rocks brought from all over the region and built the mosque on an artificial island connected to the mainland by a narrow causeway. The mosque is now well inland, since the water was filled in during the construction of a modern port.

See also
List of Friday mosques designed by Mimar Sinan

References

External links

Interior pictures of Kılıç Ali Pasha Mosque
 a map and a short guide for Sinan's works in Istanbul 
 Outside exterior photos of Kılıç Ali Pasha Mosque
 Kılıç Ali Pasha Mosque
 Over 50 pictures, mainly of the interior

16th-century mosques
Mimar Sinan buildings
Ottoman mosques in Istanbul
Mosque buildings with domes
Buildings and structures in Beyoğlu
Mosques completed in 1587